Lei Lina  (born 19 February 1988) is a Chinese and Australian table tennis player who has a leg length difference of 6 cm. Lei has won ten medals in five Paralympic Games, including six gold and four silver medals. She won a gold medal and a silver medal after representing Australia at the 2020 Summer Paralympics.

She began playing at age 7. She attended Nanjing University of Information Science and Technology.

Move to Australia
Lei moved to Melbourne, Australia in 2017 or later. She also registered with Table Tennis Australia, and competed in the Australian Open during the 2019 ITTF World Tour (with able-bodied athletes), losing her only singles match 0–4 to South Korea's Shin Yu-bin.

In 2020,  Lei represented Australia at the  2020 Tokyo Paralympics where she won the gold medal in the Women's individual – Class 9 and the silver medal in the Women's Team Class 9–10.

At the 2022 Commonwealth Games, she won the silver medal in the Women's singles C6–10.

Recognition
2020 - 2022 - Member of the Australian Table Table Tennis Team (Class 9–10) that was awarded 2020 Paralympics Australia Team of the Year 
2022 – Medal of the Order of Australia for service to sport as a gold medallist at the Tokyo Paralympic Games 2020

References

External links
 
 

1988 births
Living people
Paralympic table tennis players of China
Paralympic table tennis players of Australia
Chinese female table tennis players
Table tennis players at the 2004 Summer Paralympics
Table tennis players at the 2008 Summer Paralympics
Table tennis players at the 2012 Summer Paralympics
Table tennis players at the 2016 Summer Paralympics
Table tennis players at the 2020 Summer Paralympics
Medalists at the 2004 Summer Paralympics
Medalists at the 2008 Summer Paralympics
Medalists at the 2012 Summer Paralympics
Medalists at the 2016 Summer Paralympics
Medalists at the 2020 Summer Paralympics
People from Lanzhou
Paralympic gold medalists for China
Paralympic silver medalists for China
Paralympic gold medalists for Australia
Paralympic silver medalists for Australia
Paralympic medalists in table tennis
Table tennis players from Gansu
Chinese emigrants to Australia
Nanjing University of Information Science and Technology alumni
FESPIC Games competitors
Recipients of the Medal of the Order of Australia
Commonwealth Games silver medallists for Australia
Commonwealth Games medallists in table tennis
Table tennis players at the 2022 Commonwealth Games
Medallists at the 2022 Commonwealth Games